is a Japanese judoka.
She was born in Ageo, Saitama, and began judo at the age of a second grader. She entered the Komatsu Limited after graduating from Saitama University in 1998.

She was known as a rival of Ryoko Tamura. She fought with Tamura 10 times and was defeated 10 times, but never by Ippon.

In 2000, after Tamura won gold medal at Olympic Games, Nagai retired.

As of 2008, Nagai coaches judo at Komatsu Limited, and Ayumi Tanimoto, one of her pupil, inherits the skill of Uchimata that Nagai was good at.

References 

Japanese female judoka
1974 births
People from Ageo, Saitama
Sportspeople from Saitama Prefecture
Living people
Komatsu Limited
Saitama University alumni
Universiade medalists in judo
Universiade gold medalists for Japan
Medalists at the 1999 Summer Universiade
20th-century Japanese women
21st-century Japanese women